Don Harper (192130 May 1999) was an Australian composer.

Born in Melbourne in 1921, Don Harper showed an interest in music from an early age, learning to play the violin as a child. His formal study began at the New South Wales Conservatorium of Music. In later years he would become the successful conductor of one of Australia's most popular big bands as well as being a prolific film and television composer. 

In 1955 he emigrated to England, and found himself much in demand for television scores. During his seven-year stay in the country he provided music and themes for World of Sport, The Big Match, Champion House and Sexton Blake amongst other popular series. The Don Harper Sextet also broadcast regularly on the BBC's 'Music While You Work'. 

Returning to Australia in 1962, Don Harper would regularly be seen performing on Australian television and on radio as well as in many jazz clubs across the country.  He also toured with the Dave Brubeck Quartet. In the late 70s, Harper formed the Harper-Wright quartet with British jazz guitarist Denny Wright; the quartet was completed by Len Skeat on bass and Martin Drew on drums. In 1983 Harper took up the position of Head of Jazz Studies at Wollongong University's School of Creative Arts, a position he held until 1990. He died in 1999, aged 78.

His most popular recording was "The Hot Canary". He provided incidental music for the 1968 Doctor Who serial The Invasion; one of the cues from this score was later reused, in reorchestrated form, as part of the De Wolfe stock score of Mary Millington's True Blue Confessions (1980).

In 2005, MF Doom and Danger Mouse, in their collaborative project Danger Doom, sampled Don Harper's "Chamber Pop" and "Thoughtful Popper". Elements of "Dank Earth" from the Dawn of the Dead soundtrack were sampled on "Intro" by Gorillaz from Demon Days, which was also produced by Danger Mouse.

References

External links

1921 births
1999 deaths
Musicians from Melbourne
Australian male composers
Australian composers
Sydney Conservatorium of Music alumni
20th-century composers
20th-century Australian musicians
20th-century Australian male musicians